Tania Ann Luiz (born 28 August 1983) is an Australian badminton player. At the age of nine, Luiz moved with her family to Melbourne, Australia. She started playing badminton three years later, and went on to represent Australia at the 2006 Commonwealth Games, coincidentally in her home city. She defeated South Africa's Michelle Edwards and Fiji's Karyn Whiteside in the preliminary rounds, before losing out her third match to New Zealand's Rachel Hindley, with a score of 7–21 and 12–21.

Luiz qualified for the women's doubles at the 2008 Summer Olympics in Beijing, by placing fifteenth and receiving a continental spot for Oceania from the Badminton World Federation's ranking list. Luiz and her partner Eugenia Tanaka lost the preliminary round match to Japanese pair Miyuki Maeda and Satoko Suetsuna, with a score of 4–21 and 8–21.

Shortly after the Olympics, Luiz was selected as the member of the Badminton World Federation's Athletes Commission, along with five other athletes, including Guatemala's Pedro Yang.

Achievements

Oceania Championships
Women's singles

Women's doubles

Mixed doubles

BWF International Challenge/Series (4 titles, 7 runners-up)
Women's singles

Women's doubles

Mixed doubles

  BWF International Challenge tournament
  BWF International Series tournament
  BWF Future Series tournament

References

External links
Profile – Australian Olympic Team
NBC Olympics Profile

1983 births
Living people
Indian emigrants to Australia
Australian female badminton players
Sportspeople from Kochi
Sportswomen from Kerala
Sportspeople from Melbourne
Racket sportspeople from Kerala
Australian people of Malayali descent
Australian sportspeople of Indian descent
Olympic badminton players of Australia
Badminton players at the 2008 Summer Olympics
Badminton players at the 2006 Commonwealth Games
Commonwealth Games competitors for Australia
Sportswomen from Victoria (Australia)